The Franco-German Palatinate Forest-North Vosges Biosphere Reserve was created in 1998 as the first UNESCO trans-boundary biosphere reserve in Europe. The German part became the 12th of 16 biosphere reserves in Germany and the French one the 6th of 14 in France.

The biosphere reserve is a fusion of the older Palatinate Forest Nature Park in Germany and Northern Vosges Regional Nature Park in France, covering a total area of 3,018 km², with 1,809.7 km² in Germany and 1208.3 km² in France respectively.

Geography

Location 
The biosphere reserve lies in the Palatinate Forest and in the North Vosges on the boundary between the southwest German state of Rhineland-Palatinate and the northeast French region of Grand Est.

Gallery

See also 
 Palatinate Forest Nature Park, German part
 Northern Vosges Regional Nature Park, French part

References

External links 

 Palatinate Forest Nature Park
 Vosges du Nord RegionalNature Park  (French)

Geography of the Palatinate (region)
Geography of Bas-Rhin
Geography of Moselle (department)
Palatinate Forest
Vosges
Biosphere reserves of France
Biosphere reserves of Germany
France–Germany relations